or Rx was a one-off side project by Skinny Puppy band member Nivek Ogre, in collaboration with Invisible Records founder Martin Atkins. The project was originally called Ritalin, but the name was changed for legal reasons.

Rx released an album of industrial rock music, Bedside Toxicology, in 1998.

Discography 
Bedside Toxicology  (1998)
Dubs (2006, Limited to 500 copies)

See also 
Pigface, a band featuring Martin Atkins
Skinny Puppy, a band featuring Nivek Ogre

References

Skinny Puppy
Musical groups established in 1998
Musical groups disestablished in 2006
Musical groups from Vancouver
Canadian industrial music groups
1998 establishments in British Columbia
2006 disestablishments in British Columbia